Ladu Kishore Swain (8 July 1947 – 5 February 2019) was an Indian politician who was the Member of Parliament in the Lok Sabha from Aska in the Indian state of Odisha.
He was a member of the Biju Janata Dal (BJD) political party. He was a member of the Legislative Assembly of Odisha.

He died from kidney disease on 5 February 2019, at Apollo Hospital in Bhubaneswar.

See also
 Indian general election, 2014 (Odisha)

References

1947 births
2019 deaths
India MPs 2014–2019
Lok Sabha members from Odisha
Members of the Odisha Legislative Assembly
People from Ganjam district
Deaths from kidney disease
Biju Janata Dal politicians